Daniel Orozco Álvarez (born 1 February 1987) is a Spanish retired footballer who played as a central defender.

Football career
Orozco was born in Fuengirola, Province of Málaga. After starting out with local UD Fuengirola Los Boliches he joined neighbouring Málaga CF in 2007, representing the reserve team in the fourth division for two seasons.

In July 2009, Orozco signed for another side in Andalusia, Unión Estepona CF in the third level, but returned to his previous club in the following transfer window. On 24 March 2010 he made his first-team – and La Liga – debut, playing the full 90 minutes in a 0–1 away loss against Valencia CF and, even though the team was threatened with relegation until the last day of the season, he was still able to appear in a further three (complete) league matches.

Orozco moved to Asteras Tripoli F.C. from Greece in the summer of 2010, partnering compatriot Rubén Pulido in central defence. He scored his first goal for his new club on 20 November 2010, in a 1–1 draw against Olympiakos Volos FC.

References

External links

1987 births
Living people
People from Fuengirola
Sportspeople from the Province of Málaga
Spanish footballers
Footballers from Andalusia
Association football defenders
La Liga players
Segunda División B players
Tercera División players
UD Fuengirola Los Boliches players
Atlético Malagueño players
Málaga CF players
Super League Greece players
Asteras Tripolis F.C. players
Nemzeti Bajnokság I players
Lombard-Pápa TFC footballers
Spanish expatriate footballers
Expatriate footballers in Greece
Expatriate footballers in Hungary
Spanish expatriate sportspeople in Greece
Spanish expatriate sportspeople in Hungary